Soup to Nutz is a daily comic strip drawn by Rick Stromoski. It centers on the Nutz family, particularly the three children in the family.

The comic launched in March 2000, went into reprints on March 5, 2018, and ended its run on May 28, 2018. It was syndicated by the Newspaper Enterprise Association.

Characters 
Roy Nutz: The patriarch of the Nutz family, a typical blue-collar working man. The short-tempered head of the Catholic household enjoys watching TV and drinking beer.
Pat Nutz: Roy's wife.
Roy Nutz, Jr., aka Royboy: The oldest of the three Nutz children. Huskily built, he is rather slow witted, overeats, and enjoys sports.
Babs Nutz: The middle of the three Nutz children is the only girl, and the smartest. She is able to manipulate both Royboy and Andrew to her advantage.
Andrew Nutz: The youngest of the three Nutz children. Andrew enjoys playing with dolls, and is bossed around on a regular basis by both of his older siblings.

Collections 

Soup to Nutz: The First Course (2003); 
Soup to Nutz A Second Helping (2013);

References

External links
Soup to Nutz at United Media
  Soup to Nutz, A Family Affair: Exclusive Interview with Cartoonist Rick Stromoski Tiziano Thomas Dossena, L'Idea Magazine, 2014

American comic strips
2000 comics debuts
2018 comics endings
Comic strips started in the 2000s
Comic strips ended in the 2010s
Comics about married people
Gag-a-day comics
Slice of life comics